Derek Klein (born April 1954) is a British stamp dealer, collector and accountant, who spent 16 months in jail in 2007-08 for stealing £70,000 from two church parishes in Norfolk. In an unusual court ruling, the judge at his trial allowed him to repay the money he had stolen through the sale of the stamps he had bought with the proceeds of his fraud.

Fraud
Over a period of 14 years, Klein stole about £13,000 from St Peter's in Ridlington and £57,000 from St Andrew's in Bacton, both in Norfolk, England. He was treasurer of both churches.

He used the money for "an internet gambling addiction and his obsession with stamps". It was heard in court that Klein's nickname on one of the internet gambling sites he used was "The Bishop".

In 2008, Klein persuaded the judge at Norwich Crown Court, who had wanted to sell Klein's entire collection at auction, to let him sell it piecemeal on eBay, saying that he could raise four times as much. In 2013, the decision was vindicated, when Klein finished paying off his debt. Had Klein not been successful, he would have had to spend two more years in prison.

Klein's collection of 100,000 first day covers weighed about three tons.

References

Living people
British stamp dealers
1954 births
English accountants
English fraudsters
British philatelists